Iridopsis gemella is a species of geometrid moth in the family Geometridae.

The MONA or Hodges number for Iridopsis gemella is 6587.

References

Further reading

 

Boarmiini
Articles created by Qbugbot
Moths described in 1966